Sopwith may refer to:

 Douglas George Sopwith (1906–1970), Scottish engineer
 Karl Sopwith (1873–1945), English clergyman
 Sopwith Aviation Company, defunct British aircraft manufacturer
 Sopwith (video game), 1984 video game
 Thomas Sopwith (disambiguation), several people

See also
Sopworth, a village in Wiltshire, England, has sometimes been spelled "Sopwith"